"Don't Feel Like Crying" is a song by Norwegian singer-songwriter Sigrid, recorded for her debut studio album, Sucker Punch (2019). It was released on 17 January 2019 as the record's fourth single. A pop break-up anthem, its lyrics discuss moving through a breakup positively and postponing heartbreak. The track received positive reviews from  music critics for its encouraging message. Sigrid performed "Don't Feel Like Crying" on The Late Show with Stephen Colbert.

Background and composition
Speaking about the song, Sigrid stated "There's a certain grace to heartache. A sort of...epic grace! I like good, heartfelt pop songs." The song was written by Sigrid, Emily Warren, and Oscar Holter, the latter of whom also produced the track.

"Don't Feel Like Crying" is a pop break-up anthem composed of orchestral stabs and slick vocal effects. In his album review of Sucker Punch, Neil Garcia of Exclaim! compared the song to the works of Carly Rae Jepsen. Lyrically, the single discusses moving through a breakup positively and postponing heartbreak. In the pre-chorus, the singer belts "Wallowing in it would be such a waste. That isn't gonna fix it anyway."

Critical reception
Nick Reilly of NME called the single "one of [Sigrid's] most emotionally resilient tracks yet." Mike Wass of Idolator wrote that few songs "tap into the emotional amnesia before the inevitable meltdown as honestly as 'Don't Feel Like Crying.'" DIY magazine labelled the song "another feel-good offering from the singer."

Live performances
Sigrid performed "Don't Feel Like Crying" on The Late Show with Stephen Colbert on 19 February 2019.

Track listing
Digital download
"Don't Feel Like Crying" – 2:37
MK Remix
"Don't Feel Like Crying" (MK Remix) – 3:40
"Don't Feel Like Crying" (MK Extended Remix) – 7:13

Personnel
Adapted from Tidal.
Sigrid – lead artist, songwriter
Emily Warren – songwriter
Oscar Holter – producer, songwriter, bass guitar, keyboards, drums, programmer
Martin Sjølie – assistant producer
Mattias Bylund – strings
Mattias Johansson – violin
David Bukovinszky – cello
Chris Gehringer – mastering engineer, studio personnel
Serban Ghenea – mixing engineer, studio personnel

Charts

Weekly charts

Year-end charts

Certifications

References

2019 singles
Songs written by Emily Warren
Sigrid (singer) songs
Songs written by Sigrid (singer)
Songs written by Oscar Holter
2019 songs